Robert Colin Marshall (May 19, 1883 – February 20, 1962) was a politician in Alberta, Canada.  Marshall served as the 20th Mayor of Calgary, Alberta from 1919 to 1921, and as a Member of the Legislative Assembly of Alberta.

Marshall was born in Ingersoll, Ontario in 1883 to parents Peter Marshall and Katherine Allen.  He arrived in Calgary in 1906 and started working for the Crown Paving Company Limited.  Marshall was associated with this company until its sale in 1961.

In 1907, he married Annie Mae Batchelor, who died in 1915.  Together they had one child, Margaret Alexandra, born in 1909. On July 19, 1919, in his first year as mayor he married Daisy Mary MacGregor, the City Hall reporter for the Calgary Herald. Together they had two children, Donald and Joan.

Marshall would spend three years serving as an Alderman on Calgary City Council. Marshall would serve as Mayor of Calgary for two years, first contesting the 1918 Calgary municipal election defeating opponent and incumbent Mayor Michael Copps Costello with 3,428 votes, a slim margin of victory of 194. Marshall also contested the 1919 election, easily defeating opponent Issac G. Ruttle.

He then moved on to provincial politics, becoming a Liberal MLA just as the Liberals lost power to the United Farmers of Alberta. He ran as a Liberal in the 1921 Alberta general election.  He won a provincial seat to sit as MLA for Calgary electoral district.  His support dropped significantly in the 1926 Alberta general election and he was not re-elected.

In 1928, Marshall moved to Edmonton and remained there until his retirement.  He was involved in the YMCA, Rotary Club and the Alberta Union of Municipalities.  He was a freemason and an oddfellow.

He ran for the House of Commons of Canada in Edmonton East as a Liberal candidate in a by-election held on  March 21, 1938 but was defeated by Social Credit candidate Orvis A. Kennedy.

Marshall died in 1962 while holidaying in Fort Lauderdale, Florida.

References

Bibliography

External links

1883 births
1962 deaths
Alberta Liberal Party MLAs
Mayors of Calgary
People from Ingersoll, Ontario
Calgary city councillors
20th-century Canadian politicians